Plectida is an order of nematodes belonging to the class Chromadorea.

Families:
 Camacolaimidae De Coninck & Schuurmans Stekhoven, 1933
 Chronogastridae Gagarin, 1975
 Haliplectidae Chitwood, 1951
 Metateratocephalidae Eroshenko, 1973
 Peresianidae Vitiello & De Coninck, 1968
 Plectidae Örley, 1880

References

Nematodes